is an airport located  Masuda, Shimane Prefecture, Japan. It is also known as Hagi-Iwami Airport due to its proximity to the city of Hagi in Yamaguchi Prefecture. It is a 2 or 3 hour drive from the old town of Iwami, its primary namesake.

Operation
There are two daily round trip flights from Tokyo. During late summer another daily round trip flight from Osaka is available for about a month.

In late Summer the annual Inaka Ride cycling event course includes riding on the runway.

In late Autumn the annual Hagi-Iwami Airport Marathon starts near the airport gateway and the starting course includes running on the runway.

For both events the daily scheduled flights are not interrupted.

History
Iwami Airport opened in July 1993 with service to Tokyo Haneda and Osaka Itami. These services experienced weak passenger demand in the airport's first years of operation, despite local subsidies and reduced landing fees intended to make them more competitive. The Iwami-Haneda route boarded a record number of passengers in 2013 after Marine Corps Air Station Iwakuni opened for passenger flights, as this made it possible to create tour packages to Izumo-taisha, Itsukushima Shrine and other regional attractions using both airports as gateways. Iwami's IATA airport code of IWJ was originally used by Iwakuni when it hosted international flights between 1952 and 1964.

Airlines and destinations

References

External links
Shimane Prefecture page about Iwami Airport 
 
 

Airports in Japan
Transport in Shimane Prefecture
Buildings and structures in Shimane Prefecture
Masuda, Shimane